XHSCC-FM is a radio station broadcasting on 102.9 FM in San Cristóbal de las Casas, Chiapas. The station is known as Somos Radio with a cultural format.

History
XHSCC-FM was permitted on March 6, 2013, more than twelve years after it was applied for on October 13, 2000.

References

Radio stations in Chiapas
San Cristóbal de las Casas